John Harry Cheshire (born 9 February 1933) is a Welsh former professional rugby league footballer who played in the 1950s and 1960s.

Background
John Cheshire was born in Newport district, Wales.

International honours
John Cheshire won a cap for Wales while at Salford in 1959.

References

1933 births
Living people
Oldham R.L.F.C. players
Rugby league players from Newport, Wales
Rugby league centres
Salford Red Devils players
Wales national rugby league team players
Welsh rugby league players